"The Christmas Waltz" is a Christmas song written by Sammy Cahn and Jule Styne for Frank Sinatra, who recorded it in 1954 as the B-side of a new recording of "White Christmas", in 1957 for his album A Jolly Christmas from Frank Sinatra, and in 1968 for The Sinatra Family Wish You a Merry Christmas.

Cahn recalls, "One day during a very hot spell in Los Angeles the phone rang and it was Jule Styne to say, 'Frank wants a Christmas song.'" Cahn resisted. "Jule, we're not going to write any Christmas song. After Irving Berlin's 'White Christmas'? The idea's just ridiculous." Styne was emphatic, however. "'Frank wants a Christmas song.'"

The two met in Styne's apartment to begin work on the project, and Cahn asked the composer, "'Hey, Jule, has there ever been a Christmas waltz?' He said no. I said, 'Play that waltz of yours.' He did so," and Cahn began work on the lyrics of "The Christmas Waltz", which many other artists have also recorded.

Referring to the line that goes, "And this song of mine, in three-quarter time," Cahn writes, "You'll notice there's an impure rhyme in that lyric, 'mine' and 'time'." He notes that another of his collaborators, Jimmy Van Heusen, would not have let him get away with such an imperfection but that Styne was not quite so rigid.

For what would become the B-side of "White Christmas", Sinatra first recorded "The Christmas Waltz" with a chorus as well as an arrangement by Nelson Riddle on August 23, 1954. On July 16, 1957, Gordon Jenkins took over the arranging, and The Ralph Brewster Singers provided backing vocal on the recording for A Jolly Christmas from Frank Sinatra. On August 12, 1968, Riddle again provided arrangements, but it was The Jimmy Joyce Singers who lent their voices to the recording for The Sinatra Family Wish You a Merry Christmas.

In 1992, Mel Tormé made a recording of the song for his first-ever Christmas album, for which the liner notes indicate that "Mr. Cahn wrote a new full set of additional lyrics as a personal gift to Mel."

There was not a version of the song that reached any of the various charts in Billboard magazine, however, until the 2003 holiday season when Harry Connick Jr. reached number 26 with it on the Adult Contemporary chart during a two-week stay that began in the issue dated January 3, 2004.

Covers
"The Christmas Waltz" has been covered many times over the years by a wide variety of artists, including:

Peggy Lee - Christmas Carousel (1960)
Doris Day - The Doris Day Christmas Album (1964)
Jack Jones - The Jack Jones Christmas Album (1964)
Bing Crosby - The Hollywood Palace (ABC, 1966)
Pat Boone - Christmas Is a Comin''' (1966)
The Lettermen - For Christmas This Year (1966)
Robert Goulet - Robert Goulet's Wonderful World of Christmas (1968)
Robert Goulet & Carol Lawrence - The Great Songs of Christmas: Album Eight (various artists, 1968)
David Rose - The David Rose Christmas Album (1968)
Nancy Wilson - The Capitol Disc Jockey Album - December 1968 (various artists, 1968)
The Lennon Sisters - The Joyous Songs of Christmas (various artists, 1971)
Sammy Cahn - An Evening with Sammy Cahn (1972)
The Osmonds - The Osmond Christmas Album (1976)
The Carpenters - Christmas Portrait (1978)
Johnny Mathis - Christmas Eve with Johnny Mathis (1986)
Andy Williams - I Still Believe in Santa Claus (1990)
Mel Tormé - Christmas Songs (1992)
Meredith D'Ambrosio & Hank Jones - Mistletoe Magic: Holiday Jazz Improvisations (various artists, 1993)
Kathie Lee Gifford - Christmas with Kathie Lee Gifford (1993)
Anita O'Day -Christmas Songs (various artists, 1993)
Margaret Whiting - A Cabaret Christmas (various artists, 1993)
Brecker Brothers & Steve Khan - Jazz to the World (various artists, 1995)
Oscar Peterson - An Oscar Peterson Christmas (1995)
Rosemary Clooney - White Christmas (1996)
Scott Hamilton - Christmas Love Song (1997)
Don McLean - Christmas Dreams (1997)
Natalie Cole - Christmas with You (1998) & The Magic of Christmas (1999)
George Shearing - Christmas with the George Shearing Quintet (1998)
Michael W. Smith (duet with Sandi Patty) - Christmastime (1998)
Beegie Adair - Jazz Piano Christmas (1999)
Tommy Flanagan - An Uptown Christmas (various artists, 1999)
Helen Reddy - The Best Christmas Ever (2000)
Barry Manilow - A Christmas Gift of Love (2002)
Harry Connick Jr. - Harry for the Holidays (2003)
Clay Aiken - A Clay Aiken Christmas (NBC, 2004) & All Is Well (2006)
Dianne Reeves - Christmas Time Is Here (2004)
Jane Monheit - The Season (2005)
Toni Tennille - Christmas with the Pops (Cincinnati Pops Orchestra, 2006)
Tony Bennett - A Swingin' Christmas (Featuring The Count Basie Big Band) (2008)
Kristin Chenoweth - A Lovely Way to Spend Christmas (2008)
Mindy Gledhill - Winter Moon: Songs for Christmas (2011)
She & Him - A Very She & Him Christmas (2011)
John Travolta - This Christmas (2012)
Susan Boyle - Home For Christmas'' (2013)
Norah Jones - I Dream of Christmas (Deluxe Edition) (2022)
Laufey - The Christmas Waltz (2022)

Notes

References

Songs with lyrics by Sammy Cahn
Songs with music by Jule Styne
Frank Sinatra songs
American Christmas songs
Songs about dancing
1954 songs